Charles Henry Noll (January 5, 1932 – June 13, 2014) was an American professional football player and head coach. Regarded as one of the greatest head coaches of all time, his sole head coaching position was for the Pittsburgh Steelers of the National Football League (NFL) from 1969 to 1991. When Noll retired after 23 years, only three other head coaches in NFL history had longer tenures with one team.

After a seven-year playing career that included two NFL Championships as a member of his hometown Cleveland Browns and several years as an assistant coach with various teams, in 1969 Noll took the helm of the then moribund Steelers (which had played in only one post-season game in its previous 36 years, a 21–0 loss), and turned it into a perennial contender. As a head coach, Noll won four Super Bowls, four AFC titles and nine Central Division championships, compiled a  overall record, a 16–8 playoff record and had winning records in 15 of his final 20 seasons. His four Super Bowl victories rank second behind Bill Belichick for the most of any head coach in NFL history.  His four Super Bowl wins are the most ever by a coach without a Super Bowl loss.

Between his playing and coaching tenures, Noll won a total of seven NFL Championships as well as one AFL Championship and was elected to the Pro Football Hall of Fame in 1993, his first year of eligibility.

Noll built the team through astute drafting and meticulous tutoring. During his career, he was notable for the opportunities he gave African Americans, starting the first black quarterback in franchise history and hiring one of the first black assistant coaches in league history. He was often credited with maintaining the morale of the Western Pennsylvania region despite its steep economic decline by creating a team of champions in the image of its blue-collar fan base.

Biography

Early life

Childhood
Noll was born in Cleveland, Ohio, the youngest of three siblings (by eight years) of William Noll (a butcher, frequently unable to work owing to Parkinson's disease) and Katherine Steigerwald Noll (who worked for a florist). The family lived in the house Noll's mother grew up in with her 12 siblings, near East 74th Street, in a neighborhood with a large African-American population, a fact that helps account for Noll's early championing of opportunity for African Americans in the NFL (both players from traditionally black colleges and later as coaches). On a local youth football team Noll played with Harold Owens, the nephew of Olympic star Jesse Owens.

High school/Middle School
Noll attended Benedictine High School. He began working in seventh grade and by the time he entered high school, he had saved enough for two-year's worth of the $150 tuition. Throughout high school he continued to work, making 55-cent an hour at Fisher Brothers meat market after school. Education was always important to him, so despite the schedule, he studied enough to graduate 28th in a class of 252.

He played running back and tackle on the high school football team, winning All-State honors. During his senior year, he was named to the All Catholic Universe Bulletin team by the Diocese of Cleveland newspaper. Noll was also a wrestler while in high school.

College
Noll planned to attend Notre Dame, but during a practice before his freshman year he suffered an epileptic seizure on the field. Notre Dame coach Frank Leahy refused to take the risk of allowing Noll to play there and so Noll accepted a football scholarship to the University of Dayton. Noll graduated with a degree in secondary education. As a member of the Flyers, he was a lineman, linebacker and a co-captain, and acquired the nickname, the "Pope," for his "'infallible' grasp of the game."

Player for Cleveland Browns
Noll was selected by the Cleveland Browns in the 20th round of the 1953 NFL Draft (239th overall). During his first year, the Browns lost to the Detroit Lions in the NFL championship. The next two years the Browns were NFL champions.  Noll finished his NFL career with 8 interceptions, 3 fumble recoveries, and a touchdown on one of each.

Although the undersized Noll was drafted as a linebacker, Coach Paul Brown used him as one of his "messenger guards" to send play calls to the quarterback (beginning with Otto Graham). Brown recalled that Noll soon "could have called the plays himself without any help from the bench. That's how smart he was." According to Art Rooney, Jr. (director of scouting for the Steelers before and during most of Noll's tenure), however, Noll felt demeaned by Brown's use of him in that way and "disliked the term 'messenger boy' so much that as coach of the Steelers he entrusted all the play calling to his quarterbacks."

Noll was paid only $5,000 per season with the Browns and so while there he acted as substitute teacher at Holy Name High School and sold insurance on the side. During that period Noll also attended Cleveland-Marshall College of Law at night. He told Dan Rooney that he decided against becoming a lawyer because "he didn't really like the constant confrontation and arguments that come with being a lawyer."

Instead, when Noll lost the starting guard position to John Wooten, he chose to retire at age 27 expecting to begin his coaching career at his alma mater. He was surprised, however, when he was not offered an open position on the University of Dayton coaching staff. He was offered a position by Sid Gillman on the staff of the Los Angeles Chargers, during its inaugural season.

Coaching career

Assistant coaching career
Noll was an assistant coach for the American Football League's then Los Angeles and later San Diego Chargers from 1960 to 1965. He then became assistant to head coach Don Shula of the NFL Baltimore Colts from 1965 to 1968, when he was selected as the Pittsburgh Steelers' head coach.

Los Angeles/San Diego Chargers
Noll is considered part of Sid Gillman's coaching tree. He later remembered Gillman as "one of the game's prime researchers and offensive specialists. In six years, I had more exposure to football than I normally would have received in 12 years." During Noll's six-year tenure with the Chargers, where he was defensive line coach, the defensive backfield coach and defensive coordinator, the team appeared in five AFL championship games. Gillman said that Noll "had a great way with players," specifically "If a guy didn't do the job expected, Chuck could climb on his back." Massive defensive tackle Ernie Ladd said that Noll was a "fiery guy" but also "the best teacher I ever played under." "He and I were always fighting, always squabbling, but he had a great way of teaching. I take my hat off to Chuck. He was one of the main reasons for our success." The defensive line under Noll became known as the "Fearsome Foursome," and during 1961 defensive end Earl Faison was named AFL rookie of the year.

During Noll's time at Chargers, Al Davis was also an assistant and scout. Davis would later become coach and general manager of the Oakland Raiders, the principal AFC rival of the Steelers' in the 1970s.

Baltimore Colts
With the Colts, Noll was defensive backfield coach and later defensive coordinator. Together with assistant coach Bill Arnsparger the Colts employed shifting alignments of rotating zone and maximum blitz defensive packages. In 1968, Noll's last season as defensive coordinator, the Baltimore Colts compiled a 13–1 record in the regular season and tied the NFL season record for fewest points allowed (144).

Shula was impressed by Noll's approach: "He explained how to do things and wrote up the technique. He was one of the first coaches I was around that wrote up in great detail all of the techniques used by players—for example, the backpedal and the defensive back's position on the receiver. He was like a classroom teacher."

The Colts won the NFL championship by routing the Cleveland Browns 34–0 in Cleveland, but were shocked by the upstart AFL champion New York Jets, 16–7, in Super Bowl III at the Orange Bowl in Miami. The next day, Noll interviewed for the head coach position in Pittsburgh.

Pittsburgh Steelers
At age 37, Noll was named the 14th head coach of the Pittsburgh Steelers on January 27, after Penn State coach Joe Paterno turned down an offer for the position. At the time of his hiring, he was the youngest head coach in the NFL. Steelers owner Art Rooney would later credit Don Shula as the person who recommended Noll as a head coach. Noll implemented a defensive system in Pittsburgh that became the legendary "Steel Curtain" defense. His coaching style earned him the nickname of The Emperor Chaz by sports announcer Myron Cope. Noll was the first head coach to win four Super Bowls (IX, X, XIII, XIV).

The key to Noll's coaching success during this run was the Steelers' skill in selecting outstanding players in the NFL college player draft. Noll's first round-one pick was Joe Greene, a defensive tackle from North Texas State, who went on to become a perennial All-Pro and anchor the defensive line. During the next few years, the Steelers drafted quarterback Terry Bradshaw (Louisiana Tech) and running back Franco Harris (Penn State) as round one picks. In the 1974 draft, Noll and the Steelers achieved a level of drafting success never seen before or since, when they selected four future Hall of Fame players with their first five picks: wide receivers Lynn Swann and John Stallworth, middle linebacker Jack Lambert, and center Mike Webster. To this day, no other draft by any team has included more than two future Hall of Famers.

A meticulous coach, Noll was known during practice to dwell on fundamentals—such as the three-point stance—things that professional players were expected to know. For instance, Andy Russell, already a Pro Bowl linebacker before Noll arrived and one of the few players Noll kept after purging the roster his first year, was told by Noll that he didn't have his feet positioned right. As a result of Noll's attention to detail, Russell went on to become a key member for the first two Super Bowl teams and started the linebacker tradition that continues today in Pittsburgh.

Noll was a well-read man who valued education and expected likewise from his team, so he sought players who studied useful or practical subjects in college and had interests outside of football. "I didn't want to pick guys who just took wood shop or some other easy course they could breeze through to play football." he explained.

While most of his contemporaries, as well as current NFL head coaches, enforced strict curfew rules on its players, Noll was very lax on off-the-field behavior. This was shown at Super Bowl IX. While Noll's counterpart – Minnesota Vikings head coach Bud Grant – strictly kept his team in their hotel rooms except for practice before the game, Noll told his team upon arriving in New Orleans to go out on Bourbon Street "and get the partying out of your system now."

The hallmark of the team during the 1970s was a stifling defense known as the Steel Curtain. Linemen L. C. Greenwood, Joe Greene, as well as Ernie Holmes and Dwight White, linebackers Jack Ham, and Jack Lambert had a collective level of talent unseen before in the NFL.

The teams that won Super Bowls IX and X used a run-oriented offense, primarily featuring Franco Harris and blocking back Rocky Bleier. Over the next few years, Terry Bradshaw matured into an outstanding passer, and the teams that won Super Bowls XIII and XIV fully utilized the receiving tandem of Lynn Swann and John Stallworth.

Noll was notoriously shy and did not like the media or give many interviews. His 1970s teams were so talented that his contributions as head coach (and architect of the team) often were overlooked.

The first half of the 1980s would see the team continue their excellence (making the playoffs for three straight years from 1982 to 1984), even as they failed to reach the Super Bowl, but as the team, facing a spate of injuries and departures to their Super Bowl-winning teams by the decade's second half, began to skid and would see three losing seasons from the years 1985 to 1989. In 1989, Noll finally achieved some recognition as NFL Coach of the Year, when he guided the Steelers into the second round of the playoffs. The team was not especially talented and lost its first two regular-season games by scores of 51–0 and 41–10. However, Noll did a remarkable job in keeping the team focused and steadily improving its play as they made the playoffs and played competitively in two playoff games; Noll went a combined 16–16 in his last two seasons at the helm of the Steelers.

Post-coaching life
Noll retired as Steelers head coach after the 1991 season with a record of 209–156–1, regular season and postseason combined. He was elected to the Pro Football Hall of Fame in 1993.

The last team he coached gave him a gift of a stationary bicycle, which he avidly used.

Noll maintained a residence in suburban Pittsburgh, however, he spent some time at his Florida home. His mobility was limited by chronic back problems. Noll held the ceremonial title of Administration Adviser in the Pittsburgh Steelers' front office but had no real role in the team's operations after his retirement. He spent about half the year in Pittsburgh with his wife Marianne. Their son, Chris, is a teacher in a private high school in Connecticut.

Noll died of natural causes in his suburban Pittsburgh condo on June 13, 2014, having suffered for years from Alzheimer's disease, a heart condition and back problems. Noll's funeral was held on June 17, 2014 at St. Paul's Cathedral in Pittsburgh.

Legacy

Noll's legacy includes providing opportunities for African Americans. Under Noll, Joe Gilliam became the league's first African American starting quarterback just a few seasons after the AFL started Marlin Briscoe, and James Harris (Gilliam started ahead of Terry Bradshaw briefly during the 1974 season). In 1975, Franco Harris became the first African American to win the Super Bowl MVP award. During the 1980s, Tony Dungy (who briefly played under Noll in the late 1970s) got his start as an NFL assistant coach, initially as the Steelers' Defensive Backs Coach, and later he became the first African-American Coordinator in the NFL. Noll strongly promoted Dungy as a well-qualified head coaching candidate, but it did not happen for Dungy with the Steelers when Noll retired after the 1991 season. However, Dungy did become head coach of the Tampa Bay Buccaneers and later became the first African American coach to win a Super Bowl (XLI) with the Indianapolis Colts.

On August 2, 2007, the field at St. Vincent Seminary in Latrobe, Pennsylvania was dedicated and renamed Chuck Noll Field in honor of the former coach. For more than 40 years the Steelers have held their summer camp at St. Vincent College, as it was Noll's idea to take the team away from the distractions in the city to prepare for the season each year.

Chuck Noll was honored on October 7, 2007, at Heinz Field during the pre-game ceremonies.

On September 30, 2011, Pittsburgh honored Noll by naming a new street after him.  Chuck Noll Way connects North Shore Drive to West General Robinson St.  The street runs along Stage AE, on the North Shore of Pittsburgh.

Head coaching record

Coaching tree
Assistants under Chuck Noll who became college or professional head coaches:
 Rollie Dotsch: Birmingham Stallions (1983–1985)
 George Perles: Michigan State Spartans (1983–1994)
 Lionel Taylor: Texas Southern University (1984–1988), England Monarchs (1998)
 Woody Widenhofer: Oklahoma Outlaws (1984), Missouri Tigers (1985–1988), Vanderbilt Commodores (1997–2001)
 Bud Carson: Cleveland Browns (1989–1990)
 Rod Rust: New England Patriots (1990), Montreal Alouettes (2001)
 Joe Walton:  New York Jets (1983–1989), Robert Morris College (1994–2013)
 Tony Dungy: Tampa Bay Buccaneers (1996–2001), Indianapolis Colts (2002–2008)
 Hal Hunter: Louisiana State University (1999)
 John Fox: Carolina Panthers (2002–2010), Denver Broncos (2011–2014), Chicago Bears (2015–2017)

See also
 List of National Football League head coaches with 50 wins
 List of professional gridiron football coaches with 200 wins
 List of Super Bowl head coaches
 List of American Football League players

References

External links
 
 

1932 births
2014 deaths
Dayton Flyers football players
American football offensive guards
American football linebackers
Cleveland Browns players
Los Angeles Chargers coaches
San Diego Chargers coaches
Baltimore Colts coaches
Pittsburgh Steelers head coaches
Pro Football Hall of Fame inductees
Sportspeople from Cleveland
Super Bowl-winning head coaches
Players of American football from Cleveland